KPSI-FM is a commercial radio station located in Palm Springs, California, broadcasting on 100.5 FM. KPSI-FM airs a hot adult contemporary music format branded as "Mix 100.5". It is owned by Alpha Media, through Alpha Media Licensee LLC.

History
KPSI-FM signed on June 13, 1980, originally broadcasting on 100.9 FM.  At the time, the station aired a top 40/contemporary hit radio format branded as "KPSI-101" and later "Power 101."  In November 1991, the frequency was changed to 100.5. On March 19, 2002, KPSI-FM dropped the top 40 format in favor of its current hot adult contemporary music format and "Mix 100.5" branding.

External links

PSI-FM
Hot adult contemporary radio stations in the United States
Radio stations established in 1980
1980 establishments in California
Alpha Media radio stations